The 1918 Boston Red Sox season was the 18th season in the franchise's Major League Baseball history. The Red Sox finished first in the American League (AL) with a record of 75 wins and 51 losses, in a season cut short due to World War I. The team then faced the National League (NL) champion Chicago Cubs in the 1918 World Series, which the Red Sox won in six games to capture the franchise's fifth World Series. This would be the last World Series championship for the Red Sox until 2004. 

With World War I ongoing, a "work or fight" mandate was issued by the government, requiring men with non-essential jobs to enlist or take war-related jobs by July 1, else risk being drafted. Secretary of War Newton D. Baker granted an extension to MLB players through Labor Day, September 2. In early August, MLB clubs decided that the regular season would end at that time. As a result, AL teams played between 123 and 130 regular-season games (including ties), reduced from their original 154-game schedules. Later in August, Baker granted a further extension to allow for the World Series to be contested; it began on September 5 and ended on September 11. World War I would end two months later, with the Armistice of 11 November 1918.

The Red Sox' pitching staff, led by Carl Mays and Bullet Joe Bush, allowed the fewest runs in the league. Babe Ruth was the fourth starter and also spent significant time in the outfield, as he was the best hitter on the team, leading the AL in home runs and slugging percentage.

Regular season

Season standings

Record vs. opponents

Opening Day lineup

Roster

Player stats

Batting

Starters by position
Note: Pos = Position; G = Games played; AB = At bats; H = Hits; Avg. = Batting average; HR = Home runs; RBI = Runs batted in

Other batters
Note: G = Games played; AB = At bats; H = Hits; Avg. = Batting average; HR = Home runs; RBI = Runs batted in

Pitching

Starting pitchers
Note: G = Games pitched; IP = Innings pitched; W = Wins; L = Losses; ERA = Earned run average; SO = Strikeouts

Other pitchers
Note: G = Games pitched; IP = Innings pitched; W = Wins; L = Losses; ERA = Earned run average; SO = Strikeouts

Relief pitchers
Note: G = Games pitched; W = Wins; L = Losses; SV = Saves; ERA = Earned run average; SO = Strikeouts

Awards and honors

League top ten finishers
Bullet Joe Bush
 #3 strikeouts (125)
 #5 earned run average (2.11)

Harry Hooper
 #3 runs scored (81)

Carl Mays
 #3 wins (21)
 #5 strikeouts (114)

Babe Ruth
 #1 home runs (11)
 #1 slugging percentage (.555)
 #2 on-base percentage (.411)
 #3 runs batted in (66)

1918 World Series

AL Boston Red Sox (4) vs. NL Chicago Cubs (2)

References

External links
1918 Boston Red Sox team page at Baseball Reference
1918 Boston Red Sox season at baseball-almanac.com

Boston Red Sox seasons
Boston Red Sox
Boston Red Sox
1910s in Boston
American League champion seasons
World Series champion seasons